English general election may refer to the following elections to the Parliament of England:

1661 English general election
March 1679 English general election
October 1679 English general election
1681 English general election
1685 English general election
1689 English general election
1690 English general election
1695 English general election
1698 English general election
January 1701 English general election
November 1701 English general election
1702 English general election
1705 English general election

See also 
List of United Kingdom general elections